Kiamba may refer to:

 Kiamba, Queensland, Australia
 Kiamba, Sarangani, Philippines